Jane Thabantso (born 22 January 1996) is a Mosotho footballer who plays as a forward for Matlama and the Lesotho national team.

References

1996 births
Living people
Lesotho footballers
Association football forwards
Matlama FC players
Lesotho international footballers